The Joint Declaration on the Doctrine of Justification (JDDJ) is a document created and agreed to by the Catholic Church's Pontifical Council for Promoting Christian Unity (PCPCU) and the Lutheran World Federation in 1999 as a result of Catholic–Lutheran dialogue. It states that the churches now share "a common understanding of our justification by God's grace through faith in Christ." To the parties involved, this essentially resolves the 500-year-old conflict over the nature of justification which was at the root of the Protestant Reformation. The World Methodist Council adopted the Declaration on 18 July 2006. The World Communion of Reformed Churches (representing the "80 million members of Congregational, Presbyterian, Reformed, United, Uniting, and Waldensian churches"), adopted the Declaration in 2017.

In substance, the PCPCU and the Lutheran World Federation acknowledge in the declaration that the excommunications relating to the doctrine of justification set forth by the Council of Trent do not apply to the teachings of the Lutheran churches set forth in the text; likewise, the churches acknowledged that the condemnations set forth in the Lutheran Confessions do not apply to the Catholic teachings on justification set forth in the document.

Reception
Support for the joint declaration was not universal among Lutherans. Of the 124 members of the Lutheran World Federation, 35 cast votes against JDDJ; these included many churches who are also members of the International Lutheran Council.  Member churches of the Confessional Evangelical Lutheran Conference even stated that "JDDJ [...] should be repudiated by all Lutherans."

Some Catholics have raised other objections. Some contend that the Lutheran signers do not have the required authority to represent their communities (since, from a Catholic perspective, they are not full churches) and, therefore, that no Lutheran can make the agreement binding on the constituents of the Lutheran World Federation. The final paragraph of the Annex to the Official Common Statement, however, settles this matter.

Other Catholics object to the statement itself, arguing that it is out of line with the Council of Trent, but the document is clear that it is not negating or contradicting any statements from Trent; rather, it is arguing for the non-applicability of its canons to concrete Christian bodies in the modern world. The document was approved by the Vatican under the auspices of the PCPCU, which was established by Pope John XXIII at the Second Vatican Council and is headed by a Catholic bishop; thus, the declaration is (at least) an exercise of the ordinary magisterium of the episcopally consecrated individuals who authorized the statement. A clarification was issued jointly by the PCPCU and the Congregation for the Doctrine of the Faith, which is also an exercise of the ordinary magisterium.

On 18 July 2006, the World Methodist Council, meeting in Seoul, South Korea, voted unanimously to adopt the document.

The leadership of the World Communion of Reformed Churches—representing 80 million members of Congregational, Presbyterian, Reformed, United, Uniting and Waldensian churches—also signed the document and formally associated with it at an ecumenical prayer service on 5 July 2017.

In 1986 the Anglican-Roman Catholic International Commission (ARCIC) produced a statement called "Salvation and the Church", which observed that the two Communions are agreed on the essential aspects of the doctrine of salvation and on the Church’s role within it. Consequently, Anglican Consultative Council Resolution 16.17 "welcomes and affirms the substance of the Joint Declaration on the Doctrine of Justification (JDDJ), signed by Lutherans and Roman Catholics in 1999", in the St. Anne's Church in Augsburg, Germany.

References

Further reading 

 Response of the Catholic Church to the Joint Declaration of the Catholic Church and the Lutheran World Federation on the Doctrine of Justification
 31 october 1999 Angelus by John Paul II on the topic
 Methodist Statement on Adoption of the Declaration
 LCMS - The Joint Declaration on the Doctrine of Justification in Confessional Lutheran Perspective
 Official Common Statement by the Lutheran World Federation and the Catholic Church

External links
Text of the Joint Declaration on the Doctrine of Justification

20th-century Christian texts
Catholic–Protestant ecumenism
20th-century Lutheranism
Lutheran texts
20th-century Catholicism
1999 in Christianity